State Highway 242 (SH 242) is a Texas state highway connecting The Woodlands and Patton Village in southeast Texas.

Route description
SH 242 begins at  FM 1488 in The Woodlands. The roadway, also known locally as College Park Drive, curves to the southeast and passes to the south of W. G. Jones State Forest. It then turns to the east and crosses  I-45 in the southern outskirts of Conroe. The route continues to the east, crossing  FM 1314 and  FM 1485, before reaching its eastern terminus at  I-69 / US 59 in Patton Village.

History
SH 242 was originally designated on December 22, 1936 as a route from SH 6 at or near Hempstead to SH 38 (now SH 6) at or near Sugar Land. This route was deleted on September 26, 1939, as it became part of SH 6. SH 242 was designated between I-45 and US 59 (now dual-signed as I-69/US 59) on May 22, 1985. The westward extension to FM 1488 was designated on May 29, 1986. 

A pair of flyover ramps connecting SH 242 westbound to southbound I-45 and northbound I-45 to westbound SH 242 were constructed in 2015 by the Montgomery County Transportation Program (MCTP). The flyovers were both tolled, utilizing solely electronic toll collection and were opened to the public on May 11, 2015, initially toll-free. Between July 6, 2015, and May 28, 2019, the flyovers were tolled, with the Montgomery County Toll Road Authority (MCTRA) owning and maintaining the ramps while the Harris County Toll Road Authority (HCTRA) collected the toll fees. After a unanimous vote by the Montgomery County Commissioners Court, the tolls on the flyovers were lifted, with ownership and maintenance being transferred to the Texas Department of Transportation (TxDOT).

Major intersections

References

Transportation in Montgomery County, Texas
242
Conroe, Texas